Cheikh Abdoul Khadre Cissokho (born 1936) is a Senegalese agricultural engineer and politician. He is the former Minister and President of the Senegalese National Assembly from 1993 to 2001.

References

Senegalese politicians
1936 births
Living people
Agriculture ministers of Senegal
Environment ministers of Senegal
Water ministers of Senegal